Eacles silkae is a moth in the family Saturniidae. It is found in French Guiana.

References

Ceratocampinae
Moths described in 2011